Gregor Schneider (born 1969 in Rheydt) is a German artist. His projects have proven controversial and provoked intense discussions. In 2001, he was awarded the Golden Lion at the Venice Biennale for his infamous work Totes Haus u r exhibited at the German Pavilion.

Life and work 
Gregor Schneider studied from 1989 to 1992 at several German Art Academies including the Kunstakademie Düsseldorf (Art Academy of Düsseldorf) and at Kunstakademie Münster (Academy of Fine Arts Münster), and at the Hochschule für bildende Künste (University of Fine Arts Hamburg). From 1999 to 2003, he served as a guest professor / educational activities at several art schools, including De Ateliers in Amsterdam, the Academy of Fine Arts Hamburg, and De Ateliers in Amsterdam, the Academy of Fine Arts Hamburg and at the Royal Danish Academy of Fine Arts, Copenhagen. From 2009 to 2012 he was a professor of sculpting at the University of Art Berlin and from 2012 to 2016 a professor at the Academy of Fine Arts, Munich. Since 2016 he is a follower of Tony Cragg at Arts Academy Düsseldorf as a professor of sculpting.

In 2015, Gregor Schneider was elected to the North Rhine-Westphalian Academy of Sciences, Humanities and the Arts. In May 2018, Schneider was elected as a new member of the Visual Arts Section on the Berlin Academy of Arts.

At the age of 16, Schneider had his first solo exhibition entitled, Pubertäre Verstimmung, at the gallery Kontrast in Mönchengladbach. Since the beginning of the 1990s he has worked with rooms in galleries and museums. He conceives the rooms as the-dimensional, sculptures that can be walked through, which oftentimes hide or alter the existing gallery- and museum rooms; the rooms he works with are existing rooms he finds in different dwellings or domestic buildings. In 1985 he began dismantling and rebuilding rooms in an apartment building in Rheydt, which he entitled, Haus u r.

The "Haus u r" 

Since 1985, Schneider has been working elaborately on the house on Unterheydener Strasse in Mönchengladbach's Rheydt district. The "u r" refers to Unterheydener Strasse und Rheydt. Gregor Schneider created replicas of the existing rooms by building complete rooms inside of other rooms each consisting of walls, ceilings and floors. These doubled rooms are not visible as rooms within rooms to the viewers. Additionally, he slowly moves the rooms out of sight by employing machines that push ceilings or complete rooms. Hollow and interspaces are the results of the form of the installations. Some rooms become inaccessible because they are hidden behind walls and some have been isolated by concrete, plumbing, insulation or sound-absorbing materials. Via outside fixed lamps, different times of the day have been simulated. The rooms are numbered consecutively (u r 1 -) for a clear distinction. In the beginning, the originals rooms have been all areas of a house: a bedroom, a coffee room, a lumber-room, a kitchen, a corridor, a cellar. Since the middle of the 1980s visitors of the Haus u r have been reported as having had frightening experiences inside the house.

"Totes Haus u r" in Venice 
In 2001, Gregor Schneider won the "Golden Lion" at the 49th Biennale in Venice, with his solo exhibition, "Totes Haus u r Venedig 2001". Udo Kittelmann, at that time, director of the Kölnischen Kunstverein invited the artist to create solo exhibition in the German pavilion. Within three months time Schneider built a Totes Haus u r inside the pavilion, he transported by ship a total of 24 original rooms using100 packing pieces with a combined weight of 150 tons from Rheydt to Venice; Schneider refers to the rooms, which he has built out of the Haus u r or which have been rebuilt at another place, as Totes Haus u r.

Schneider rebuilt the rooms inside the German pavilion into a similar house with double walls and double floors on the ground in a house just as he did in Rheydt. He remodeled a late 19th-century entrance with columns as standard door entrance with a letterbox-slot and aged doorbell panels on the side. Inside windows could not be opened to the outside. "One builds what one no longer knows", Schneider commented about his installation. Within the Biennale the work has also been interpreted as a subtle political declaration, because the German pavilion building from 1909 has been often considered as the most "intimidating" building "in the area of the Giardini".

In 2003, the Tote Haus u r was constructed for one year inside the Museum of Contemporary Art Los Angeles.

Cube 

In 2005, Gregor Schneider was officially invited to realize the Cube Venice 2005 at the Piazza di San Marco in Venice during the 2005 Biennale. Shortly before the opening of the exhibition, the sculpture was rejected due to its "political nature". Cube Venice 2005 was intended to be an independent sculpture in form, function and appearance, inspired by the Kaaba in Mecca, the holiest place of Islam, the destination of millions of believers who make the pilgrimage every year. Kaaba means "cubic building". This artwork became an international controversy discussed widely in the media. As a result, it was rejected shortly before being realized in the courtyard of the Hamburger Bahnhof, museum of contemporary art in Berlin. Finally, Schneider realized his work Cube Hamburg 2007 between the old and new buildings of the Hamburger Kunsthalle. Under the artistic direction of the curator, Dr Hubertus Gaßner, director of the Hamburger Kunsthalle, different aspects of a painting from 1878 to 1935 were analyzed in an exhibition entitled "The Black Square – Hommage to Malevich". To convey the different aspects of "The Black Square" the exhibition featured further works by Malevich as well as works of his contemporaries, scholars, and critics.

The Cube Hamburg 2007 has been used as an inter-religious platform. Ahmet Yazici, the deputy president of the alliance of the Islamic communities in North Germany, congratulated the artist "on his project which fosters understanding amongst international cultures".

Gregor Schneider said with regard to the origin of the idea of the cube: "It is not my idea, but the idea of a believing Muslim. He saw the connection to the Kaaba, to this building, which, in my view, is one of the most fascinating and beautiful buildings of in the history of mankind". Schneider made the following remark about the work: "The sculpture demands something from every participant (...) The box summons us all, it allows me to look past the critical reporting and to call on the public, something I didn't have to do before. It challenges Muslims, which didn't know this way of rapprochement before, and it shows something to the visitors of the western world they have never seen before. In the history of Islam Abraham/Ibrahim is the constructor of the Kaaba. All three Monotheistic religions can identify with this building very well."

Bondi Beach, 21 beach cells 

A 400 square meter large installation composed of 21 identical cells sprung up at one of the most famous beaches on the Australian east coast, the Bondi Beach, under the correspondent title Bondi Beach, 21 beach cells. This to the exhibition place syntonized artwork questions "the ideal of a casual, egalitarian leisure-loving society", even there "elsewhere beachballers and backpackers, marathon swimmers and wedding couples define the image".

END 

From November 8, 2008, to September 6, 2009, Gregor Schneider's 14 meter high, black outdoor sculpture "END" was accessible to the public. The artist built "END" in front of the Museum Abteiberg in Mönchengladbach. The sculpture was connected to the museum and served as an alternative entrance. Before walking through the "END" the visitor had to sign a release form that stated that they understood they were entering of their own accord into an environment with "steep ladders, narrow and/or totally dark rooms which may cause physical and/or mental impairment". After signing the declaration the visitor was allowed to enter the room-ensemble "END" by a huge ladder through a black entrance. In most parts of the room, the total darkness caused the visitor to lose all sense of orientation in the space. The only possibility for the visitor to orient themselves was by feeling the walls of the corridor. Four rooms out of the Haus u r were integrated into the "END".

Controversy 

In the spring of 2008, Schneider caused a media controversy with his stated idea: "I want to display a person dying naturally in the piece or somebody who has just died. My aim is to show the beauty of death." In April 2008, the artist was quoted in The Art Newspaper as saying:" I want to display a person dying naturally in peace or somebody who has just died" and "My aim is to show the beauty of death". Shortly after, German newspaper headlines read, "Artist wants to let people die". Politicians of several German political parties, the CDU, FDP and Die Grünen, voiced their opinions accusing Schneider of "abusing of artistic freedom" calling his plans an "attempt at provocation" and a "half-baked idea". On several online newspapers threads, people posted comments that glorified violence. Schneider got death threats by phone and mail. "There are absurd death threats against me", Schneider said in an interview with Westdeutsche Zeitung. On April 21, he told the newspaper Die Welt: "I want to create human places for the dying and the dead". The Guardian headline on April 26 read: "There is nothing perverse about a dying person in an art gallery". Overall, there was extensive media coverage in several countries in multiple languages.

Schneider describes the constructed room in depth. He wants to offer this room in a museum to a dying or a dead person. This could only be realized with the respective agreement of the participant, the relatives and with a nurse or caretaker present on site. He wants to lead death out of the social taboo with this public dying room and to make it into a positive experience similar to the birth of a human being.

Exhibitions and projects 
 1985 Pubertäre Verstimmung, Galerie Kontrast, Mönchengladbach
 1985 – today Haus u r, Rheydt
 1992 1985–1992 September 92 – , Galerie Löhrl, Mönchengladbach
 1993 16. September 1993 – , Konrad Fischer Galerie, Düsseldorf
 1994 11. März 1994 – , Galerie Andreas Weiss, Berlin
 1994 Drei Arbeiten, Museum Haus Lange, Krefeld
 1995 Fotos und Videos 1985–1995, Galerie Luis Campaña, Cologne
 1996 Gregor Schneider, Kunsthalle Bern, Bern
 1996 Gregor Schneider, Künstlerhaus Stuttgart, Stuttgart
 1997 schlafen, Konrad Fischer Galerie, Düsseldorf
 1997 Hannelore Reuen alte Hausschlampe, Rheydt 1992, Galerie Luis Campaña, Cologne
 1997 Totes Haus u r 1985–1997, Rheydt, Kunsthalle Frankfurt a. M., Frankfurt a. M.
 1997 Gregor Schneider, Gallery Wako Works of Art, Tokyo
 1997 Puff(aus Berlin), Gallery Sadie Coles HQ, London
 1998 Puff, Städtisches Museum Abteiberg, Mönchengladbach
 1998 La maison morte u r 1985–1998, Musee d'Art Moderne de la Ville de Paris, Paris
 1998 Gregor Schneider, Gallery Wako Works of Art, Tokyo
 1998 haus u r, Rheydt, Aarhus Kunst Museum, Denmark
 1999 Death House 1985–1999 Cellar, Galleria Massimo de Carlo, Milano
 1999 53rd Carnegie International, Carnegie Museum of Art, Pittsburgh, Pennsylvenia
 1999 schlafen, Kabinett für aktuelle Kunst, Bremerhaven
 1999 Totes Haus, Rheydt, Kunsthalle Bremerhaven, Bremerhaven
 2000 Hannelore Reuen Alte Hausschlampe, Fundacja Galerii Foksal, Warszawa
 2000 Keller, Wiener Secession, Wien
 2000 Alte Hausschlampe, Museum Haus Esters, Krefeld
 2000 Apocalypse, Beauty and Horror in Contemporary Art, Royal Academy of Art, London
 2000 Death House u r, Douglas Hyde Gallery, Dublin
 2001 Totes Haus u r, 49. Biennale von Venedig, Venezia
 2001 N. Schmidt, Kabinett für aktuelle Kunst, Bremerhaven
 2002 Haus u r, Stiftung DKM, Duisburg
 2002 Gregor Schneider, Konrad Fischer Galerie, Düsseldorf
 2002 Gregor Schneider, Gallery Wako Works of Art, Tokyo
 2002 Fotografie und Skulptur, Museum für Gegenwartskunst, Siegen
 2003 Gregor Schneider. Hannelore Reuen, Hamburger Kunsthalle, Hamburg
 2003 My Private #1, via Pasteur 21, Milano
 2003 Death House u r, Museum of Contemporary Art Los Angeles, California
 2003 517West 24th, Barbara Gladstone Gallery, New York
 2003 Gregor Schneider, Aspen Art Museum, Aspen
 2004 Die Familie Schneider, Artangel London, London
 2005 Cube Venice 2005, Gallery Konrad Fischer, Düsseldorf
 2005 28. August 2005 – , Kabinett Für Aktuelle Kunst Bremerhaven, Bremerhaven
 2006 Totalschaden, Bonner Kunstverein, Bonn
 2006 4538KM, MDD Museum Dhont-Dhaenens, Deurle,
 2006 Doublings, Galerie Luis Campaña, Cologne
 2006 Gregor Schneider Fotografie, Kunstverein Arnsberg e. V, Arnsberg
 2006 2. November 2006, Kunst-Station Sankt Peter Köln, Cologne
 2006 My Private escaped from Italy, Centre international d'art et du paysage de L'ile Vassiviere, Ile de vassiviere
 2006 26. November 2006, Fondazione Morra Greco, Napoli
 2007 Gregor Schneider, Milwaukee art Museum, Milwaukee
 2007 Weisse Folter, K20K21 Kunstsammlung Nordrhein-Westfalen, Düsseldorf
 2008 süßer duft, La Maison Rouge, Paris
 2008 Gregor Schneider. Doublings, Museum Franz Gertsch, Burgdorf BE
 2008 Cube Venice – Design and conception, Fondazione Bevilacqua La Masa, Venezia
 2008 END, Museum Abteiberg, Mönchengladbach
 2009 Garage 2009. Museum Abteiberg, Mönchengladbach
 2010 Gregor Schneider – Marienstraße, Peill Prize, Leopold-Hoesch-Museum, Düren
 2011 Punto Muerto, Centro de Arte 2 de Mayo, Madrid
 2011 Sterberaum, Kunstraum Innsbruck, Innsbruck
 2014 Gregor Schneider. Hauptstraße 85 a, Synagoge Stommeln
 2014 Neuerburgstrasse 21, Installation in der Halle Kalk des Schauspiel Köln
 2014 German Angst, Yokohama Triennale 2014, Yokohama Museum of Art, Yokohama
 2014 Gregor Schneider: Totlast, Lehmbruck Museum, Duisburg in Zusammenarbeit mit der Ruhrtriennale (wurde vom Oberbürgermeister der Stadt Duisburg abgesagt)
 2014 Liebeslaube, Volksbühne Berlin, Berlin
 2014 it's all Rheydt, Gallery Wako Works of Art, Tokyo
 2014 Die Familie Schneider, Konrad Fischer Galerie, Berlin
 2014 unsubscribe, Zacheta – National Gallery of Art, Warszawa
 2014 unsubscribe, Volksbühne Berlin, Berlin
 2015 White Torture 2005 – today, XII Bienal de La Habana, La Habana, Cuba
 2015 Gregor Schneider, Museum Künstlerkolonie, Darmstadt, Germany
 2016/2017 Gregor Schneider: Wand vor Wand (2. Dezember 2016 bis 19. Februar 2017), Kunst- und Ausstellungshalle der Bundesrepublik Deutschland, Bonn
 2017 Kindergarten, Museo Universitario Arte Contemporáneo, Ciudad de México, Mexico
 2017 Invisible City, Onassis Cultural Centre / Fast Forward Festival, Omonia Square, Athens
 2017 N. Schmidt, Pferdegasse 19, 48143 Münster, Skulptur Projekte Münster 2017, LWL-Museum für Kunst und Kultur, Münster, Germany
 2017 Never Ending Stories, Kunstmuseum Wolfsburg, Wolfsburg, Germany
 2018 Fundamentalist Cubes: Inside Spaces by Bruce Nauman, Absalon, and Gregor Schneider, M-ARCO, Marseille, France

Awards 
 1995 Kunstpreis NRW
 1995 Werkstipendium des Kunstfonds e.V., Bonn
 1995 Werkstipendium der Stiftung Kunst und Kultur, NRW
 1996 Projektförderung Institut für Auslandsbeziehungen, Stuttgart
 1996 Karl-Schmidt-Rottluff-Stipendium
 1996 Peter Mertes Stipendium
 1996 Dorothea von Stetten Art Award
 1997 Förderpreis der Alfried Krupp von Bohlen und Halbach Stiftung
 1998/99 Kunststipendium Bremerhaven
 1999 Art Scholarship Villa Romana, Florence
 2001 Golden Lion, Biennale Venedig
 2002 1. Preis des Papier-Kunst-Preises des Verband Deutscher Papierfabriken VDP
 2006 Best Exhibition of the Year, Contemporary Art in Belgium 2006
 2008 Günther Peill Kunstpreis
 2011 Bambi LTD Award, Israel
 2011 Special Jury Award vom Star Ananda, Bengali television, India
 2014 Children's Choice Award the Ruhrtriennale 2014: Best of the Best 
 2014 Wilhelm-Loth-Prize, Darmstadt
 2014 AICA Prize: The special exhibition of 2014 
2015 Member of North Rhine-Westphalian Academy of Sciences, Humanities and the Arts
2016 Art critics have chosen the show "Wand vor Wand" in Bonn's Bundeskunsthalle for the exhibition of the year in NRW.
2018 Member of Visual Arts Section on the Berlin Academy of Arts.

Literature 
 Gregor Schneider, Udo Kittelmann: Gregor Schneider, Totes Haus Ur, La Biennale di Venezia, 2001, Hatje Cantz Verlag, 2002, 
 Gregor Schneider: Die Familie Schneider, Steidl Göttingen, 2006, 
 Gregor Schneider: Cubes: Art in the Age of Global Terrorism Gva-Vertriebsgemeinschaft, 2006, 
 Kunstforum International (Plateau der Menschheit), Nr. 156, August to October 2001. S. 288 und 305.

References

External links

 Official website
 Unofficial website
 Gregor Schneider Full Biography and Exhibition list
 Künstlerportrait, Goethe-Institut
  Das Museum die Presse und der Tod, Statement zur Kunst, Michael Staab, May 2008
 Schneiders Ausstellungsreihe "Double" im Museum für Moderne Kunst in Frankfurt, [artnet.com]

German contemporary artists
1969 births
Living people
People from Mönchengladbach